was a Japanese medical researcher who promoted a variant of the Soviet medical biologist Olga Lepeshinskaya's pseudoscientific cellular theories, known as neo-Haematology, now largely discredited.

Biography
Chishima was born in the village of Kamitakara in Gifu Prefecture, Japan. In 1953 he became a research professor at Gifu University, and in 1958 he completed his medical training earning a degree from Toho medical University. Upon his retirement from the faculty at Gifu in 1963, he became a full professor at Nagoya University. In 1964 he created and assumed the chairmanship of the Society of neo-haematology. His magnum opus - Chishima's Complete Works Regarding Biological and Medical Sciences - is a multivolume tome encompassing 5 decades of research, of which only volume 9 - Revolution of Biology and Medical Science - has been translated into English. Chishima died aged 79.

Neo-Haematology
Chishima's ideas concerning cellular theory can be seen as novel extensions of some of the more obscure theories that emerged during the Trofim Lysenko era in Russia, like those of Olga Lepeshinskaya, head of Soviet medicine under Joseph Stalin, to whose cellular theories Chishima made extensive reference.
Neo-Haematology embraces the same discredited principles as Lepeshinskaya's cellular theories. Its eight 'revolutionary principles' are as follows: 

Red blood corpuscles with polipotency differentiate into all kinds of somatic cells and germ cells, in accordance with their cellular environmental conditions (milieu).
Reversible differentiation between the red blood corpuscles and the fixed cellular elements under the different nutritional conditions or the developmental stages.
Bacteria and viruses arise spontaneously from organic matter by means of the AFD process (Aggregation, Fusion and Differentiation).
Cells increase in number, mainly by the new-formation of them from organic matter but not by the so-called mitotic cell division.
Haematopoietic organ of the red corpuscle is not the bone marrow but the intestinal villus in the adult and the placental villus in the embryonic stage.
Orthodox genetics contains some basic mistakes. For instance, according to my finding, the germ cells such as spermatozoa and the ova arise newly from the somatic element, the red blood corpuscles.
Darwinism involves some important contradictions of the origin of life, the mutation theory, existence of micro-organisms (amoebae, bacteria) which remained as they were without evolution, and then the negligence of symbiosis (mutual aid) as an important evolutional factor, etc.
I have presented a new scientific methodology, bio-dialectic instead of formal logic or material dialectic. 
(All from Chishima, 1972).

As can be seen from Chishima's principles, neo-haematology effectively called for a rejection of significant established Biological theories such the mitotic theory of cellular division, whilst advocating a belief in the spontaneous generation of microbes and the belief that tissue elements can differentiate and retro-differentiate depending purely upon environmental conditions. Chishima also rejected the chromosome theory of heredity, and embraced a form of lamarckism in line with the Lysenkoite biologists in Russia at the time. 
Chishima advocated a dialectical approach to addressing Biological problems, however he diverged sharply from his Soviet counterparts in that he rejected dialectical materialism in favor of what he termed Bio-dialectics, which incorporated spiritual elements into its framework. Much of the spiritual aspect of Chishima's work came from a desire on his part to reconcile the contradictions between Eastern and Western medicine. 

Neo-haematology is based on discredited theories and ideas, so by today's standards and even by the standards of its day it has to be considered a pseudoscience, despite this however it still has a small following in America and Japan mostly amongst New Age medicine advocates.

References
1. Chishima, K. (1972). Revolution of Biology and Medical Science. Neo-Haematological Society Press, Gifu, Japan.

2. http://www.polder.net/chishima/

3. https://web.archive.org/web/20070203024142/http://www.chishima.ac/

1899 births
1978 deaths
Japanese hematologists
Japanese scientists
Lamarckism
Pseudoscientific biologists